The canton of Bailleul is an administrative division of the Nord department, northern France. It was created at the French canton reorganisation which came into effect in March 2015. Its seat is in Bailleul.

It consists of the following communes:

Bailleul
Berthen
Boeschepe
Borre
Caëstre
Cassel
Le Doulieu
Eecke
Flêtre
Godewaersvelde
Hondeghem
Merris
Méteren
Nieppe
Oxelaëre
Pradelles
Sainte-Marie-Cappel
Saint-Jans-Cappel
Saint-Sylvestre-Cappel
Staple
Steenwerck
Strazeele
Vieux-Berquin

References

Cantons of Nord (French department)